Senator Craighead may refer to:

Joni Craighead (born 1954), Nebraska State Senate
Thomas Craighead (politician) (1798–1862), Arkansas State Senate